The following is a timeline of the history of the city of Mosul, Iraq.

Prior to 16th century 

 570 CE - Mar Ishaya (monastery) founded across river from Ninevah; surrounding settlement later develops.
 641 CE - Arab forces of Utba bin Farqad take fortress in settlement.
 847 CE - 24 November: Earthquake.
 874/875 CE - Taghlibi Khidr bin Ahmad becomes governor.
 880 CE - Ishaq ibn Kundaj becomes governor.
 892 - Mosul besieged by forces of Harun bin Sulayman and Banu Shayban.
 907 - Hamdanids in power.
 990s - Syrian Uqaylids in power.
 1095/1096 - Seljuqs in power.
 1127/1128 - Seljuqs ousted by Imad ad-Din Zengi.
 1146 - Saif ad-Din Ghazi I in power.
 1170 - Great Mosque of al-Nuri construction begins.
 1182 - Mosul besieged by forces of Saladin during rule of Izz ad-Din Mas'ud.
 1185 - Mosul again besieged by forces of Saladin.
 1224 - Mosul taken by forces of Badr al-Din Lu'lu'.
 1239 - Mashhad Imam Yahya ibn al-Qasim (mausoleum) built near city.
 1248 - Imam Awn al-Din shrine built.
 1258 - Mosul sacked by forces of Hulagu Khan.
 1262 - July: Mosul taken by Mongol forces.

16th–19th centuries 

 1516 - Ottomans in power.
 1535 - Ottoman administrative Mosul Eyalet created.
 1623 - Mosul taken by Persian forces (approximate date).
 1625 - Persians ousted; Ottomans in power again.
 1719 - Sari Mustafa becomes governor.
 1730 - Hussein Jalili appointed governor.
 1733 - Mosul besieged by forces of Nadir Khan.
 1743 - Siege of Mosul (1743) by Persian forces.
 1745 - Battle of Mosul (1745) fought in vicinity of city.
 1826 - Unrest; governor Yahya al-Jalili ousted.
 1839 - Ottoman administrative reform begins per Edict of Gülhane.
 1854 - "Rebellion" against administrative reform.

20th century 

 1920 - Population: 703,378 in vilayet (province).
 1926 - Mosul becomes part of the Kingdom of Iraq per League of Nations ruling.
 1947 - Population: 133,625 in city; 595,190 in province.
 1957 - Mosul football club formed.
 1960 - Ash-Shabibah newspaper published.
 1965 - Population: 264,146.
 1967 - University of Mosul founded.
 1969
  begins.
 National Insurance Company built.
 1970 - Population: 310,313 (estimate).
 1986 - Mosul Dam begins operating near city.
 1987 - Population: 664,221.

21st century 
 2003 - March–May: 2003 invasion of Iraq by U.S.-led forces; Mosul International Airport occupied.
 2004
 24 June: 2004 Mosul bombings.
 November: Battle of Mosul (2004).
 2007 - 23 April: April 2007 Mosul massacre.
 2008 - Ninawa campaign.
 2013 - April: Anti-government protest.
 2014
 4–10 June: Mosul taken by forces of the Islamic State of Iraq and the Levant.
 June: Mass executions in ISIL occupied Mosul begin.
 16–19 August: Battle for Mosul Dam fought near city.
 2015 - January: Mosul offensive (2015).
 2016 - October: Battle of Mosul (2016–17) begins.
 2017
 21 June: Great Mosque of al-Nuri destroyed.
 July: Iraqi army takes city.

See also 
 
 List of rulers of Mosul
 Nineveh, ancient Assyrian city located across river from present-day Mosul
 Timelines of other cities in Iraq: Baghdad, Basra

References 

This article incorporates information from the Arabic Wikipedia.

Bibliography 

Published in 19th century
 
 
 
 
 
 
 

Published in 20th century
  1911–1920
 
  via Google Books
  
 
 
 
 
 
 

Published in 21st century

External links

 Items related to Mosul, various dates (via Qatar Digital Library)
 Items related to Mosul, various dates (via Europeana)
 Items related to Mosul, various dates (via Digital Public Library of America)

Images 

 
Mosul
Mosul
Years in Iraq